"Dreamer" is a song by Russian child singer Alisa Kozhikina, who won the first season of The Voice Kids of Russia.  It represented Russia at the Junior Eurovision Song Contest 2014 in Marsa, Malta, placing 5th with 96 points. The song is a ballad where Alisa sings about being free like a bird and she dreams away during the music video.

Music video
There are two existing versions for the music video. The first one is filmed in black-and-white and features Alisa singing at a park and taking balloons from a woman passing by at the second chorus and in the end, she is seen singing with violinists in the background. This version is the official version that was released in the Junior Eurovision Song Contest YouTube channel on September 28, 2014. The second version of the music video was aired on Russia's Karusel TV and was uploaded to Alisa Kozhikina's official page on Facebook on November 8, 2014  and this version features Kozhikina singing against a black backdrop which later turns into a backdrop with stars and going up on a small flight of stairs for the second stanza of the song, still singing against a backdrop with stars and towards the last chorus, Kozhikina now sings against a backdrop of a white cloth that was unveiled with a projection of clouds and the music video ends with her going back to singing against a black backdrop as in the beginning of the video. The second version of the music video also comes with karaoke-style lyrics displayed at the bottom on the video.

Performances

Junior Eurovision 2014

Alisa performed "Dreamer"
at JESC 2014 in Marsa, Malta on 15 November 2014.  Russia performed 13th on the evening, after Armenia and before Serbia.  At the close of the voting, Dreamer placed 5th with 96 points.

Charts

References

Russian songs
Junior Eurovision songs
2014 singles
2014 songs
Songs written by Maxim Fadeev
Songs written by Olga Seryabkina
Alisa Kozhikina songs